Basketball at the 2015 Pacific Games in Port Moresby, Papua New Guinea was held at the BSP Arena and PNG Power Dome on 3–12 July 2015.

Guam won the gold medal in the men's tournament, defeating Fiji by 78–61 in the final. Tahiti secured the bronze medal by beating hosts Papua New Guinea by 83–73.

Fiji won the gold medal in the women's tournament, defeating American Samoa by 75–61.  Tahiti beat Papua New Guinea by 62–51 to win the bronze medal.

Medal summary

Medal table

Results

Participating nations
Ten countries competed in basketball at the 2015 Pacific Games:

Men's tournament

Group A

Group B

Classification playoffs

Source: pg2015 (archived)

Top six playoffs

Source: pg2015 (archived)

Finals
Semi-finals and medal finals were played at the Power Dome on Saturday 11 July and Sunday 12 July, respectively.

Semi-finals

Third place

Final

Women's tournament

Group A

Group B

Classification playoffs

Source pg2015 (archived)

Top four playoffs

Source pg2015 (archived)

Finals
The medal matches were played at the PNG Power Dome on Saturday 11 July.

Third place

Final

See also
 Basketball at the Pacific Games

References

2015 Pacific Games
2015
Pacific